Oxmantown was a suburb on the opposite bank of the Liffey from Dublin, in what is now the city's Northside. It was founded in the 12th century by Vikings or "Ostmen" who had migrated out of Dublin after the arrival of the English, and was originally known as Ostmanby or Ostmantown. The removal of the Ostmen from Dublin is often characterised as mass expulsion, but evidence of this is lacking. The settlement was bounded on the east by the lands of St Mary's Abbey and on the west by Oxmantown Green, an extensive common that in time was curtailed to form Smithfield Market. Oxmantown lay within the parish of St Michan's, which was the only church on the Northside until the parishes of St Mary's and St Paul's were formed in 1697 to cater to the district's burgeoning population.

The residential centre of Oxmantown was present-day Church Street. In the 17th century, there were several impressive houses here, one of them owned by Sir Robert Booth, the Lord Chief Justice of Ireland. His house abutted the garden of the King's Inns, and in 1664 he petitioned for the creation of a right of way through the garden,  so that he might more conveniently enter the Inns by a private way.

In modern times the term is still occasionally used to refer to the broader area around Smithfield, while local places such as Oxmantown Road, Oxmantown Lane and various local businesses nominally reference the place name.

See also
 List of towns and villages in Ireland

References

History of Dublin (city)
Abbey Street